The Roman Catholic Archdiocese of Košice is a Roman Catholic archdiocese in eastern Slovakia, with its seat in Košice. It covers the central and eastern parts of the Prešov and Košice regions, with an area of 10,403 km2. The diocese's area has a total population of 1,153,505 people, of which around 61% were of Catholic faith as of 2012. The Cathedral of St. Elizabeth serves as the seat of the diocese.

The current Archbishop, Bernard Bober was appointed on June 4, 2010, and canonically took power of the archdiocese on July 10, 2010. He had formerly served as auxiliary bishop under Alojz Tkáč. On June 11, 2016, priest Marek Forgáč was appointed as the new auxiliary bishop by Pope Francis.

History
It was first created in 1804 under name Diocese of Košice as a suffragan to the Archdiocese of Eger. In 1977, the metropolitan was changed to the newly established ecclesiastical province of Trnava. On 31 March 1995, a new ecclesiastical province was created, changing the status of the diocese into archdiocese with the suffragans of Spiš and Rožňava.

St Charles Borromeo Seminary, the diocese's main seminary, was founded in 1994.

See also
List of archbishops of Košice

References
Hišem, Cyril (2000). Dejiny Kňazského Seminára v Košiciach (1918-1950). Vydavateľstvo Michala Vaška. (in Slovak)
Official site 
Archdiocese of Košice at catholic-hierarchy.org

Roman Catholic dioceses in Slovakia
Catholic Church in Slovakia
Košice